The Zamperla Balloon Race is a tilting, circular motion amusement park ride manufactured by Antonio Zamperla S.p.A. The ride makes its way up a structure, and at a certain height, it starts tilting.

Designs

Gondola designs
Twelve balloons with gondolas hold up to 4 passengers each. This ride also comes in 8 balloon and 12 balloon versions. There is also an essentially identical ride with pirate ships instead of balloons. Seat belts and locking doors provide safety. At some installations, a rider may exit themselves, while in other ones, an operator must let them out.

Similar designs
The Chance Morgan company manufacture a version of the Balloon Race, which is similar except the balloons are much bigger.

Samba Balloons
A smaller version of this ride called Samba Balloons is also in existence. The ride does a similar motion, but the 'balloons' can be spun by riders. This version of the ride is often found in areas of amusement parks, and at traveling carnivals.

Some locations 
Number of balloons or pirate ships is in parentheses.
Big Easy Balloons (12) - Six Flags Great America. 
Ballons (8 Samba) - Storybook Land in Egg Harbor Township, NJ.
Balloon Race (8) - Idlewild and Soak Zone moved in 1995 from Kennywood where it lasted for four years.
Balloon Race (8) - Knott's Berry Farm's Camp Snoopy in Buena Park, CA.
Balloon Race (8) - Six Flags New England Agawam, MA.
Balloon Race - Waldameer Park, Erie, PA
Flying Ace Balloon Race (was Boo Boo's Balloon Race) (8) - Carowinds
The Pirate's Flight (12) - Geauga Lake in Ohio (themed to pirate ships instead of balloons.)
Samba Balloons (8) - Victorian Gardens at Wollman Rink in Central Park, NYC.
Up, Up, and Away (8) - Six Flags Over Georgia. (2004-Present)
Weather Balloons (8 Samba) - Darien Lake Darien Center, NY. (1996–Present)
Balloon Race (8) - Santa's Village AZoosment Park East Dundee, IL (1992–Present)
Up, Up, and Away (10) - Enchanted Kingdom Santa Rosa, Laguna, Philippines (1995–Present)
Balloon Race (12) - Mega Parc Quebec City, Quebec, Canada (1988-2017)
Balloon Race (8) - The Flambards Experience Helston, Cornwall, UK.
Balloon Race (12) - Flamingo Land Resort Malton, Yorkshire, UK.

References

External links

Zamperla Rides

Amusement rides by type